Trovon Reed (born December 30, 1990) is a former American football cornerback. He played college football at Auburn.

Early years
Reed attended Thibodaux High School in Thibodaux, Louisiana where he graduated in 2010.

College career
Coming out of high school, Reed committed to play football at Auburn University. Reed played games in five different years, spending the first four years at wide receiver and switched to cornerback for his senior season. Reed used a medical redshirt his freshman season due to a knee injury. Reed was eligible for a medical redshirt due to only playing in one game that season. Reed finished his career with 14 total tackles and 3 interceptions. Reed is a 2x SEC Champion (2010, 2013) and a 1x National Champion (2010).

Professional career

Seattle Seahawks
On May 2, 2015, after going undrafted, Reed signed an undrafted free agent deal with the Seattle Seahawks.

St. Louis Rams
On August 4, 2015, Reed signed with the St. Louis Rams replacing Devon Wylie on the 90 man roster. On September 5, 2015 Reed was waived from the Rams roster as they trimmed their roster down to 53 players. The following day the Rams signed Reed to their practice squad. On September 15, 2015, Reed was released from the Rams' practice squad.

Miami Dolphins
On October 20, 2015 Reed was signed to the Miami Dolphins' practice squad. On November 2, 2015, the Dolphins cut Reed from their practice squad.

Seattle Seahawks (second stint)
On November 17, 2015 Reed was signed to the Seattle Seahawks' practice squad. On January 18, 2016 Reed signed a futures contract with the Seattle Seahawks.
On August 30, 2016, he was waived/injured by the Seahawks and placed on injured reserve. On September 3, 2016, he was released from the Seahawks' injured reserve.

San Diego Chargers
On October 26, 2016, Reed was signed to the Chargers' practice squad. He was promoted to the active roster on November 22, 2016. He was waived on September 2, 2017.

Seattle Seahawks (third stint)
On November 14, 2017, Reed was again signed to the Seattle Seahawks' practice squad. He was released on December 12, 2017.

San Francisco 49ers
On December 20, 2017, Reed was signed to the San Francisco 49ers practice squad. He signed a reserve/future contract with the 49ers on January 2, 2018. He was waived on June 4, 2018.

Seattle Seahawks (fourth stint)
On July 27, 2018, Reed signed with the Seattle Seahawks. He was waived on September 1, 2018.

Birmingham Iron
In 2019, Reed joined the Birmingham Iron of the Alliance of American Football. He was placed on injured reserve on March 28, 2019. The league ceased operations in April 2019.

St. Louis BattleHawks
In October 2019, Reed was selected by the St. Louis BattleHawks as part of the 2020 XFL Draft. He was placed on injured reserve before the start of the season on January 21, 2020. He was waived by the BattleHawks and claimed by the Tampa Bay Vipers on February 27, 2020, and traded back to the BattleHawks the next day in exchange for defensive tackle Kellen Soulek. He had his contract terminated when the league suspended operations on April 10, 2020.

References

External links
Seattle Seahawks bio
Auburn Tigers bio

1990 births
Living people
People from Thibodaux, Louisiana
Players of American football from Louisiana
American football cornerbacks
Auburn Tigers football players
Seattle Seahawks players
St. Louis Rams players
Miami Dolphins players
San Diego Chargers players
San Francisco 49ers players
Birmingham Iron players
St. Louis BattleHawks players
Tampa Bay Vipers players